Haryana Seeds Development Corporation is an Indian state government undertaking company, established in the year 1974. under the Companies Act, 1956 with the objective of organizing production and distribution of certified seeds to the farmers of the State at reasonable rates.

Background
Haryana Seeds Development Corporation was established to provide quality seeds at affordable price in Haryana state for farmers. HSDC has a Seed Testing Lab at Umri for testing seed samples to measure quality. Their products include an assortment of field crops and vegetables.

Plants and offices
Haryana Seeds Development Corporation has six Seed processing plants at Umri, Hisar, Sirsa, Yamuna Nagar, Tohana and Pataudi in Haryana state. HSDC has one Marketing Office at Bhiwani, Haryana and 74 Sale Counters.The Corporation is maintaining a Seed Testing Lab at Umri for testing seed samples as an internal quality control measure.

Controversy
In year 2013, Managing Director Khemka has demand of Central Bureau of Investigation inquiry on purchase nearly 10,000 tonnes of wheat seeds from private suppliers, which was started on 18 October 2013.

References

Seed companies
Agricultural organisations based in India
Agriculture in Haryana
State agencies of Haryana
Agriculture companies established in 1974
Government agencies established in 1974
1974 establishments in Haryana
Indian companies established in 1974